Nonoka Yamaguchi (山口乃々華, Yamaguchi Nonoka, born March 8, 1998) is a Japanese dancer, actress and model. She is a former member of J-Pop group E-girls and represented with LDH.

Early life 
Yamaguchi was born on March 8, 1998, in Saitama Prefecture, Japan. She started her modeling career as a child after winning the special award for reader model of the magazine Shogaku shinensei (小学四年生) in 2007. A year later, she also won the semi-grand prix award for reader model of the magazine Shogaku gonensei (小学五年生). Prior to auditioning for LDH, she started having training classes at EXPG Tokyo in 2009. In 2010, Yamaguchi won the grand prix award at the 18th Pichi Lemon Audition, and started working as an exclusive model for the magazine Pichi Lemon.

Career 
In 2011, she participated of the EXILE Presents VOCAL BATTLE AUDITION 3 ~For Girls~ in the dance section and successfully passed the audition and became part of the non-debuted dance group bunny as a performer.

On August 23, 2012, she was announced as an official member of E-girls as part of bunny.

In July, 2013, Yamaguchi made acting debut on the TV drama Ashita no Hikari wo Tsukame -2013 Natsu-.

In December, 2014, she graduated from Pichi Lemon, appearing for the last time as an exclusive model of the magazine in the January 2015 issue.

In June 2018 Yamaguchi attended the red carpet event of the Short Shorts Film Festival & Asia (SSFF & ASIA), at which the Utamonogatari - Cinema Fighters Project -, in which she participated as an actress, premiered.

On December 22, 2019, with the announcement of E-girls' disbandment set for around the end of 2020, it was revealed that Yamaguchi would focus on acting and modeling activities afterwards.

In 2020, she will take on her first leading role in the live-action adaption of the manga Kiss Him, Not Me. She will star as Kae Serinuma, a fujoshi that suddenly gets the attention of four popular boys in her high school. Furthermore, Yamaguchi was chosen to narrate a documentary about the success of fellow LDH group Girls2 titled Girls2 ~The Miracle of 9~ which will air on TV Tokyo on March 22 and March 29.

Filmography 
To see her appearances with E-girls, see E-girls

TV Dramas

Films

Stage

Internet programs

Commercials

Music videos

Other work

Essay serialization

Magazines

Runways

Advertisements

References 

1998 births
Living people
Japanese child actresses
Japanese female dancers
Japanese television actresses
LDH (company) artists
Japanese female models
People from Saitama Prefecture
Japanese film actresses